Ecclesiastes 11 is the eleventh chapter of the Book of Ecclesiastes in the Hebrew Bible or the Old Testament of the Christian Bible. The book contains philosophical speeches by a character called '(the) Qoheleth' ("the Teacher"), composed probably between the 5th and 2nd centuries BCE. Peshitta, Targum, and Talmud attribute the authorship of the book to King Solomon. Michael Eaton notes that this chapter and the next are characterized by the encouragement to make decision and the need to act speedily.

Text
The original text was written in Hebrew. This chapter is divided into 10 verses: by number of verses it is the shortest chapter in Ecclesiastes.

Textual witnesses
Some early manuscripts containing the text of this chapter in Hebrew are of the Masoretic Text, which includes Codex Leningradensis (1008).

There is also a translation into Koine Greek known as the Septuagint, made in the last few centuries BCE. Extant ancient manuscripts of the Septuagint version include Codex Vaticanus (B; B; 4th century), Codex Sinaiticus (S; BHK: S; 4th century), and Codex Alexandrinus (A; A; 5th century). The Greek text is probably derived from the work of Aquila of Sinope or his followers.

Structure
The New King James Version divides this chapter into two sections:
  - The Value of Diligence
  - Seek God in Early Life

The venture of faith (11:1–6)
The keyword for this section is "faith" or considerable trust, so the ominous outlook or the unexpected happenings will not ruin the joy of life.

Verse 1
Cast your bread upon the waters,
for you will find it after many days.
"Cast your bread upon the waters": a saying about spontaneous good deeds, It seems to have a parallel in the Egyptian wisdom text Instruction of 'Onchsheshonqy (19.10), 'where the good deed thrown in the water is later recovered when dry'. 
"Bread" is in the sense of "goods, livelihood".

Verse 3

If the clouds are full of rain,
they empty themselves on the earth,
and if a tree falls to the south or to the north,
in the place where the tree falls, there it will lie.
This verse has been interpreted as having an eschatological dimension "because death will shortly cut us down".

The life of joy (11:7–10)
Qoheleth ends his long monologue with a summary of advice: "life is good and to be enjoyed", especially best when one is young, but against that enjoyment, one must remember that "darkness is to follow, and that deeds will be judged", as "to remember one's creator is also to remember one's judge".

Verse 9
Rejoice, O young man, in thy youth; and let thy heart cheer thee in the days of thy youth, and walk in the ways of thine heart, and in the sight of thine eyes: but know thou, that for all these things God will bring thee into judgment.
This is not to imply that enjoyment is contrary to God's will, because Qoheleth states multiple times that enjoyment is God's gift (2:24-26; 3:10-15; 5:18-20; 9:7-9), so it is more to mean that God will judge people for the failure to accept the gift of enjoyment.

See also
 Related Bible parts: Proverbs 8

Notes

References

Sources

External links

 Jewish translations:
 Kohelet – Ecclesiastes - Chapter 11 (Judaica Press) translation [with Rashi's commentary] at Chabad.org
 Christian translations:
 Online Bible at GospelHall.org (ESV, KJV, Darby, American Standard Version, Bible in Basic English)
 Ecclesiastes Chapter 11 King James Version
  Various versions

11